Rechtnia, 27th Abbot of Clonmacnoise, died 784.

Rechtnia succeeded Collbran who died in 776. Rechtnia was a member of the Sil Coirpre Crum of Ui Maine, as was the 22nd abbot. During his term the monastery was burned, apparently by accident. He was succeeded by snedriagail.

References

 The Abbatial Succession at Clonmacnois, p. 505, John Ryan, in Feil-Sgribhinn Eoin Mhic Neill, Dublin, 1938.

8th-century Irish abbots
People from County Galway
People from County Roscommon